Jordan Philip Fitzpatrick (born 15 June 1988) is an English footballer who plays for Walsall Wood as a midfielder. He played in the Football League for Hereford United, making one substitute appearance in Football League Two in 2007.

During his school years at Ridgewood High School, Stourbridge, he was involved in the most successful year of the school football team in 2004. The team completed a 'treble' by winning the league, cup and 6-a-side tournament. He started his career at Wolverhampton Wanderers at the age of 10, after being spotted playing for his district side. He played in the academy and at 16 was offered a two-year scholarship. He played for Wolves Reserves at the age of 15, as well as for the U17s and U19s. However, he did not make a first team appearance for the club. Notably he scored in the 2005 FA Youth Cup Semi Final only minutes after coming on as a substitute although the team eventually lost on penalties to Southampton. He was released by Wolves at the age of 18 and signed for Hereford United in September 2006, after a period training at Kidderminster. 

He featured mainly for Hereford Reserves in the 2006–07 season, also featuring in the HFA Senior Cup. He made his league debut on the final day of the season, coming on as a substitute away at Torquay United. Fitzpatrick was loaned to Bromsgrove Rovers for a month on 27 March 2008. He was released by the Bulls on 19 May  2008, and joined Worcester City in August 2008. He signed for Worcester City on 6 August 2008. He signed for Redditch United at the start of the 2010–11 season.

References

1988 births
Living people
English footballers
Wolverhampton Wanderers F.C. players
Hereford United F.C. players
Bromsgrove Rovers F.C. players
Worcester City F.C. players
Sportspeople from Stourbridge
Redditch United F.C. players
Corby Town F.C. players
Solihull Moors F.C. players
Stourbridge F.C. players
Hednesford Town F.C. players
Walsall Wood F.C. players
Association football midfielders